Thunderstone or Thunder Stone may refer to:

Thunderstone (folklore), a worked stone object often associated with a thunder god
Thunderstone (fossil), the fossilised rostra of a belemnoid
Thunderstone (band), a Finnish power metal band
Thunderstone (album), their self-titled album
Thunderstone (TV series), an Australian children's television series set on a post-apocalyptic Earth
Thunderstone (card game), a fantasy deck-building game from Alderac Entertainment Group
Thunderstone, an item in the Pokémon series that evolves certain types of Pokémon—see Gameplay of Pokémon
Thunderstone Software, a software company specializing in enterprise search
The Thunder Stone, the base of the equestrian statue of Peter the Great now known as the Bronze Horseman, purportedly the largest stone ever moved by man
The Thunder Stone, a standing stone that was part of the prehistoric Shap Stone Avenue, in Cumbria, England

See also
 Thunder Rock (disambiguation)
 Thunderegg, a nodule-like rock formed within rhyolitic volcanic ash layers